Ab Band is a district in Ghazni province, Afghanistan. Its population, which is almost entirely Pashtun, was estimated at 41,340 in 2002. The district is within the heartland of the Tarakai tribe of Ghilji Pashtuns. Ab Band is on the main road from Kabul to Kandahar. The district capital is Āb Band.

Politics and Governance 
In June 2021, Taliban forces moved into Ab Band, where they came into conflict with the local Afghan government. After the withdrawal of US forces from Afghanistan, most of Ab Band is now believed to be under Taliban control.

Geography 
Ab Band is divided into two parts, North and South Aband. Between the two is a desert and a river which flows to the south into a lake. Ab band has a number of very nice and wild mountains and hills such as Khwaja Lal Mountain, Zarcha, Laka tega, Khar koshta mountains, Zegay hills and wat Ghar plus many small mores.

Demographics 
There are four major ethnic groups settled in Ab Band: Buden Khail, Na Khail, Mul Khail and Sorkhail.

Economy 
Ab Band has no construction projects; its local people regularly go to Pakistan and Iran for work. There is also a small bazaar (town) for locals to purchase daily needs and meet neighboring villagers. The bazaar is between Bazi and Chawnai villages. Ab Band is impoverished, and many of its inhabitants rely on subsistence farming to get through winter.

Education

Healthcare

Infrastructure 
There is no main road specially, in the south during the winter about 2 or half months access to the area blocks by snow, people only go by foot.

Natural Resources 
Ab Band is known for producing grapes and resins for export to Ghazni city and Muqur district. The water sources are Kariz's (a trench 4–5 km long underground at the starting point it might be 35 m deep, but the end water reaches to the surface and flows like  mesh). During the 2000s drought most of them become dried and people rushed for water pump drills. However, there is another problem villagers are disagree with water pumps because they will dry the rest of the Kariz's in the region.

References 

 UNHCR District Profile, accessed 2006-04-20

External links 

 Map of Settlements AIMS, May 2002

Districts of Ghazni Province